The 2014–15 Championnat National season was the 17th season since its establishment. The previous season's champions were Orléans.

Teams

Stadia and locations

League table

Results

Top goalscorers

Source: Official Goalscorers' Standings

References

External links 
 

2014-15
3
Fra